Marine: A Guided Tour of a Marine Expeditionary Unit is a 1996 book written by Tom Clancy about the inner workings of a Marine Expeditionary Unit.

External links 
 

Books by Tom Clancy
Non-fiction books about the United States Marine Corps
Berkley Books books
1996 non-fiction books